Senator Bee may refer to:

Carlos Bee (1867–1932), Texas State Senate
Keith A. Bee (born 1965), Arizona State Senate
Keith Bee (fl. 1990s–2000s), Arizona State Senate
Thomas Bee (1739–1812), South Carolina State Senate
Tim Bee (fl. 2000s), Arizona State Senate